Robert Turner College and Career High School is a public high school located in Pearland, Texas, United States. It is one of three high schools in the Pearland Independent School District. In 2015, the school was rated "satisfactory" by the Texas Education Agency. Turner offers the opportunity to get their high school degree and Associates degree in only 4 years. They offer Culinary School, Computer Science, Dentistry, and more.

Namesake
Mr. Robert Turner was the Pearland Independent School District Superintendent from 1968 - 1978. In February 2007, the school board voted to name the next high school campus Robert Turner High School.  In March 2012, the school board voted to open a college & career high school.  The school opened in August 2013.

References

https://www.pearlandisd.org/Domain/748

External links
 Official Website

Schools in Brazoria County, Texas
Public high schools in Texas